"Waving Flags" is the first single to be released from British Sea Power's third studio album Do You Like Rock Music?. It was released on 7 January 2008 (UK) in CD and Vinyl format, as well being available as a digital download. It entered the UK Singles Chart at number 31, and the BBC Radio 1 Independent Label Singles chart at number one. The song was re-released in September 2008 to coincide with their Mercury Music Prize nomination.

The track can also be heard on E4's Skins where it plays out the Franky episode from Series 5 as well as on an episode of Ted Lasso on Apple TV+.

Track listings

CD
 "Waving Flags"
 "Everybody Must Be Saved"

7" Vinyl 1
 "Waving Flags"
 "Ooby Dooby Doo"

7" Vinyl 2
 "Waving Flags (Wandering Horn Instrumental)"
 "Elizabeth and Susan Meet the Pelican"

Digital download
 "Waving Flags (Single Version)"
 "Waving Flags (Hotel 2 Tango Demo Version)"
 "Waving Flags (White Mischief Live Version)"

References

British Sea Power songs
2008 singles
Rough Trade Records singles
2008 songs